Stranger in the House: The Collected Short Supernatural Fiction, Volume One  is a 2010 short story collection by Lisa Tuttle. It was published by Ash-Tree Press, a Canadian publishing company specializing in horror literature. The edition was limited to 400 copies.

The book contains 25 short stories chosen by the author herself, arranged chronologically as they were written, rather than as when they were published. The selection compiles stories published between 1972 and 1985, starting with Tuttle's first literary sale, the title story.  Most of these stories have a supernatural and horror theme, although there's also some science fiction stories; among those, Tuttle's Nebula Award winning story "The Bone Flute", a prize she refused. Some of these stories had been previously uncollected.

Contents
"A Nurturing of Nightmares: Introduction" by Stephen Jones
"Stranger in the House" (1972)
"Dollburger"(1973)
"Sangre" (1977)
"A Mother's Heart: A True Bear Story" (1978)
"Mrs T" (1976)
"Birds of the Moon" (1979)
"In the Arcade" (1978)
"The Horse Lord" (1977)
"A Piece of Rope" (1977)
"Community Property" (1980)
"The Hollow Man" (1979)
"Bug House" (1980)
"Sun City" (1980)
"The Other Room" (1982)
"The Other Mother" (1980)
"Where the Stones Grow" (1980)
"Need" (1981)
"Treading the Maze" (1981)
"The Bone Flute" (1981)
"A Friend in Need" (1981)
"The Memory of Wood" (1982)
"The Nest" (1983) 
"Redcap" (1984)
"The Cure" (1984)
"No Regrets" (1985)

External links
 

2010 short story collections
American short story collections
British short story collections
Horror short story collections
Science fiction short story collections